The Koivu mine is one of the largest titanium mines in Finland. The mine is located in Central Ostrobothnia. The mine has reserves amounting to 62.2 million tonnes of ore grading 7.75% titanium.

References 

Titanium mines in Finland